Thomas Jarvie (8 June 1916 – 1 February 2011) was a Scottish professional footballer, veterinary surgeon and television personality.

Early and personal life
Born in Glasgow and raised in Douglas, South Lanarkshire, Jarvie was married with two sons.

Football career
After beginning his career in Junior football with Douglas Water Thistle, before turning professional in 1935 with Hamilton Academical. Due to the disruptive effect that World War II had on football, Jarvie played a number of unofficial wartime games for Rangers, Hibernian, Falkirk and Third Lanark. During the 1950s he was player-manager of Crawley Town.

Veterinary career
After graduating from the University of Glasgow with a degree in veterinary medicine, Jarvie moved to England to practice, where he was a colleague of James Herriot, author of the All Creatures Great and Small series of books. In fact, he was instrumental in Herriot's - real name James Alfred Wight - choice of pen name as he was told by publishers that he could not use his 'practising' name as an author. They chose the name after watching Jim Herriot (former Scotland goalkeeper) in action, as it had a nice ring to it. Jarvie also worked as a vet for TV show Blue Peter.

References

1916 births
2011 deaths
Footballers from Glasgow
Footballers from South Lanarkshire
Scottish footballers
Scottish football managers
Scottish Junior Football Association players
Douglas Water Thistle F.C. players
Hamilton Academical F.C. players
Rangers F.C. wartime guest players
Hibernian F.C. wartime guest players
Falkirk F.C. wartime guest players
Third Lanark A.C. wartime guest players
Crawley Town F.C. players
Crawley Town F.C. managers
Scottish Football League players
Alumni of the University of Glasgow
Scottish veterinarians
Blue Peter
Scottish television personalities
Scottish Football League representative players
Association football wing halves
People from Douglas, South Lanarkshire
People educated at Lanark Grammar School